An Installment Agreement in the United States is an Internal Revenue Service (IRS) program which allows individuals to pay tax debt in monthly payments. The total amount paid can be the full amount of what is owed, or it can be a partial amount.

There are several different kinds of Installment Agreements: Guaranteed, Streamline, Partial and Full Pay.

Usually, one must owe less than $50,000 to get a streamlined installment agreement. The payment amount is the total amount of debt divided by 72 months. If the amount owed is less than $25,000 one can complete the Form 9465. If you owe more than 25,000 but less than $50,000 you need to submit a 433-D. If you owe more than $50,000 you will need to submit a financial statement or 433f or 433a. If you owe business taxes like 941 or 940 taxes your payment plan will be 24 months not 72 months. There are benefits to having an installment agreement with the IRS in that in most cases you can avoid a tax lien if you have a direct debit installment agreement.

Requirements 
Individual has to file all minimum required tax returns.
Must owe $50,000 or less. 
 Monthly payment cannot be less than $25 a month.
Keep a check on future refunds that can applied for tax refunds until tax debt is paid in full.

References 

Internal Revenue Service